The A5114 is a British A road which is located on the island of Anglesey, Wales. It runs from a roundabout just off Junction 6 of the A55 (at the intersection with the A5) to the centre of the county town, Llangefni.

The route

At just over 1.3 miles (2 kilometres) the road is an extremely short one and runs in a north-north easterly direction for its duration. A turning a corner built for the junction first 0.7 miles of the road runs straight, along flat open fields. On reaching the edge of town, there's a T-junction with left-turn slip road for an industrial estate to the east. This is the first road met since leaving the dumbbell at the A55/A5. The road then becomes a bit less ruler-straight, with some gentle curves. There are some houses on the west side, set back from the road with hedges shielding it, and a car dealership and a petrol station on the east side. There is a  bridge under the disused Anglesey Central Railway which is narrow and requires inbound traffic to give way - and the road north of here is much more urban in character. The road shortly ends at a T-junction with the one-way B5109 in the town centre, where vehicles must turn left.

Historically the road was part of the B5111.

Roads in Anglesey